Franciszek Drzewiecki (26 February 1908 - 1942) was an Orionine Father murdered by the Nazis. While imprisoned and sentenced to hard labor in Dachau concentration camp he maintained a life of prayer. Some sources report that he was gassed in the concentration camp on 10 August 1942, but other sources indicate 13 September 1942. He is one of the 108 Blessed Polish Martyrs.

References 

1908 births
Sons of Divine Providence
Polish people who died in Dachau concentration camp
1942 deaths